Popstars: Du & Ich ("Popstars: You & Me") is the eight season of Popstars, in which young aspiring singers compete in order to claim their spots to become the duo "Some & Any". This is the format for the second season of the Popstars series, focusing mostly on dancers/singers, looking for fame in the music industry. It premiered on 20 August 2009. The final combination which genders the band consisted of was open until the finals. The candidates applied alone or together, but if they applied together it was unsure if both would survive the elimination. The judge panel changed. Michelle Leonard and Alex Christensen, who was already a member of the jury, joined the judge panel. The castings through big cities ran for four episodes. The contestants took a seat in a big hall and had to step forward to the judges in groups of 4 (2+2 if they apply as duos) and sing one song in front of them. They learn from the judges decision directly after their performance. One day later, the winners of the first day prepared two songs and got to the judges alone (or as a duo) and perform both songs without forgetting any lines of the lyrics. The few contestants that got through this round continued their journey at a big decision-show in Stuttgart where they qualified for the workshop. The Workshop-Phase in Las Vegas lasted five weeks. Then the next weeks until the big Live-Finale back in Germany in December 2009, in which they finally announce the new Popstars, the contestants are in the Band-House in New York City. The Final on 10 December was won by 18-year-old Vanessa Meisinger and the Brazilian 20-year-old Leonardo "Leo" Ritzmann. They were the new Popstars duo Some & Any.

Guest performances 

In addition, songs are played during the episodes to promote an artist, single, album, or the show itself. Included is a list of those songs with their Media Control Top 100 reactions.

Television ratings 

Germany

References

External links 
 

Du and Ich
2009 German television seasons